Lee Merrien (born 26 April 1979) is a British middle distance and long-distance runner. He has been named to the British team for the 2012 Summer Olympics following a Facebook campaign after he was initially not selected to the team. He has won multiple events at the Island Games for his home of Guernsey.

Career
Merrien competed at his first Island Games in Gotland in 1999, however he did finish in a medal position that year. Representing his home of Guernsey, he went on to win nine gold medals over the next several years at the Island Games in the half marathon, 1,500 m, 5,000 m and 4 × 400 m relay, and also won two silver medals and one bronze. At the 2009 Island Games on the Isle of Wight he set Island Games records in both the 1,500 m and the 5,000 m events.

In the 2011 London Marathon, he set a new personal best of 2 h 14 min 27 s, which was within the "B" qualifying time for the 2012 Summer Olympics and was the fastest British competitor in the race. He admitted afterwards that he had mixed feelings regarding his time, as although it was a new personal best, it wasn't within the "A" qualifying time for the Games. His only previous attempt at the London Marathon was in 2010 when he finished in 12th place.

He finished 17th in the 2012 London Marathon, which was once again the highest placed British competitor in the race. He finished in a time of 2 h 13 min 41 s, a new personal best, just outside the Olympic qualifying time set by UK Athletics at 2 h 12 min. Due to this, he was not chosen for the British team at the 2012 Olympics, with Scott Overall and Dave Webb being chosen for the team, and with the third spot left deliberately empty. His time was inside the "A" time of 2 h 15 min as set by the International Association of Athletics Federations.

This resulted in an online campaign on Facebook to select Merrien for the British team, run by fan Cara Saul. The campaign resulted in 3,000 followers. Merrien appealed against the decision not to select him; his appeal was thrown out by UK Athletics. However, on 27 April, it was announced that the selectors had reversed their decision and added Merrien to the British team for the Olympics. Merrien's response was described as "ecstatic".

In his final race prior to the 2012 Games, he won a half Marathon on Guernsey in June, eight and a half minutes ahead of the second placed athlete. Prior to the games, he is to complete altitude training in the Pyrenees mountains in Europe, having previous attended camps in Iten, Kenya. At the Olympics he finished 30th in the field, the highest place Brit.

Personal life
Merrien attended the University of Bath, graduating with a degree in Coach Education and Sports Performance. He currently manages a running club. He is the spokesman for charity Male Uprising in Guernsey which aims to raise awareness of prostate, testicular and bowel cancer.

References

External links

 
 
 

1978 births
Living people
Alumni of the University of Bath
Commonwealth Games competitors for Guernsey
Athletes (track and field) at the 2002 Commonwealth Games
Athletes (track and field) at the 2006 Commonwealth Games
Athletes (track and field) at the 2010 Commonwealth Games
Athletes (track and field) at the 2018 Commonwealth Games
Athletes (track and field) at the 2012 Summer Olympics
Olympic athletes of Great Britain
Guernsey male middle-distance runners
Guernsey male long-distance runners
Guernsey people